Simon Hogan (born 16 August 1988) is a former Australian rules footballer for the Geelong Football Club in the Australian Football League (AFL).

AFL career

Early career
Hogan was recruited from the Geelong Falcons by Geelong at pick 57 in the 2006 AFL Draft. Drafted as a feather-weight at 68 kg in 2006, he gained 11 kg by the end of the year in order to take the field. His football career was hampered due to a recurring groin injury in 2007. Despite this, he was chosen as an emergency for Geelong in 2008 but did not see the field.

2009
In 2009, after playing in the NAB Cup Premiership with the Cats, Hogan made his long-awaited senior debut in Round 2 against Richmond, but he was rested thereafter and did not play again until being a late callup in Round 14 for the crucial game against St Kilda, a match between two undefeated teams. Hogan impressed under pressure, and backed it up with an even more solid outing the following week against Brisbane, named in Geelong's best in a heavy loss.

2012
Retired at the end of the 2012 season at the age of 24

Personal life
Hogan was the school captain of the Class of 2006 at Emmanuel College Warrnambool.

Statistics

|- style="background-color: #EAEAEA"
! scope="row" style="text-align:center" | 2007
|  || 34 || 0 || — || — || — || — || — || — || — || — || — || — || — || — || — || —
|-
! scope="row" style="text-align:center" | 2008
|  || 34 || 0 || — || — || — || — || — || — || — || — || — || — || — || — || — || —
|- style="background-color: #EAEAEA"
! scope="row" style="text-align:center" | 2009
|  || 34 || 10 || 7 || 3 || 64 || 115 || 179 || 33 || 24 || 0.7 || 0.2 || 6.4 || 11.5 || 17.9 || 3.3 || 2.4
|-
! scope="row" style="text-align:center" | 2010
|  || 34 || 11 || 3 || 3 || 64 || 119 || 183 || 28 || 26 || 0.3 || 0.3 || 5.8 || 10.8 || 16.6 || 2.6 || 2.4
|- style="background-color: #EAEAEA"
! scope="row" style="text-align:center" | 2011
|  || 34 || 1 || 0 || 0 || 1 || 6 || 7 || 0 || 3 || 0.0 || 0.0 || 1.0 || 6.0 || 7.0 || 0.0 || 3.0
|-
! scope="row" style="text-align:center" | 2012
|   || 34 || 0 || — || — || — || — || — || — || — || — || — || — || — || — || — || —
|- class="sortbottom"
! colspan=3| Career totals
! 22
! 369
! 129
! 240
! 61
! 53
! 10
! 6
! 16.8
! 5.9
! 10.9
! 2.8
! 2.4
! 0.5
! 0.3
|}

References

External links

Geelong Football Club players
1988 births
Living people
Australian rules footballers from Victoria (Australia)
Geelong Falcons players
Warrnambool Football Club players